Paul C. Bishop (born 1967) is a British scholar and William Jacks Chair in Modern Languages at the University of Glasgow.

Books
The Archaic: the Past in the Present. Routledge: London. 2012. 
A Companion to Friedrich Nietzsche, Life and Works. Camden House: New York, NY, USA. 2012. 
Reading Goethe at Midlife : Ancient Wisdom, German Classicism, and Jung. Spring Journal Books: New Orleans, Louisiana. 2011. 
Analytical Psychology and German Classical Aesthetics: Goethe, Schiller and Jung, 2 vols. Routledge: London, UK.

References

External links
Paul Bishop at the University of Glasgow

Continental philosophers
Nietzsche scholars
Philosophy academics
Living people
British philosophers
Alumni of the University of Oxford
Academics of the University of Glasgow
1967 births